Syed Asghar Ali (11 June 1924 – 19 April 1979) was a cricketer who played first-class cricket in India from 1943 to 1949, and in Pakistan from 1949 to 1957.

A middle-order batsman, Asghar Ali's highest score was 103 not out in a team total of 182 for Hyderabad against Central Provinces and Berar in the 1947-48 Ranji Trophy. Nobody else in the match reached 50.

He played for Pakistan in two matches against the touring Ceylon team in 1949-50. He was named as a substitute for the Pakistan team that toured India in 1952-53, and was brought over to India at one stage, but did not play.

References

External links

1924 births
1979 deaths
Cricketers from Hyderabad, India
Indian cricketers
Hyderabad cricketers
Muslims cricketers
Karachi cricketers
Pakistani people of Hyderabadi descent